Paul Leefe (born 13 October 1970) is a wheelchair rugby player from New Zealand, and a member of the national team, the Wheel Blacks.

Paul was a member of the wheel blacks at the inaugural Paralympic wheelchair rugby tournament in 1996 Summer Paralympics where it was a demonstration event.  He remained a part of the team for the next paralympics in 2000 where the team won a bronze medal.

References

External links 
 
 

1970 births
Living people
New Zealand wheelchair rugby players
Paralympic wheelchair rugby players of New Zealand
Paralympic bronze medalists for New Zealand
Paralympic medalists in wheelchair rugby
Wheelchair rugby players at the 1996 Summer Paralympics
Wheelchair rugby players at the 2000 Summer Paralympics
Medalists at the 1996 Summer Paralympics
Medalists at the 2000 Summer Paralympics